The 2016 Shepherd Rams football team represented Shepherd University during the 2016 NCAA Division II football season as a member of the Mountain East Conference (MEC). They were led by head coach Monte Cater, in his 30th season at Shepherd, and finished the season 13–1. With a conference record of 10–0, they were named MEC champions and advanced to the Division II Playoffs, losing in the semifinals to North Alabama. The Rams played their home games at Ram Stadium in Shepherdstown, West Virginia.

Preseason
After finishing the 2015 season with a record of 13–1, with the only loss coming in the national championship game to Northwest Missouri State, the Rams were ranked #4 in the preseason poll.

Regular season
The 2016 regular season for the Rams consisted of 10 games against Mountain East Conference foes. The Rams went undefeated in the regular season and were given the third seed in Super Region I in the 2016 NCAA Division II football playoffs.

Playoffs
Despite going undefeated and being ranked #3 in the nation, the Rams had to play in an opening round game of the playoffs. The Rams defeated #25 Assumption College in the game, 48–31, to advance to the Round of 16.

The Rams then went on the road and were able to defeat LIU Post, 40–21, to improve to 12–0 and continue their playoff run.

In the national quarterfinals the following week, the Rams again went on the road. This time, the Rams were able to defeat California (Pa.), 41–30.

The Rams hosted a national semifinal game for the second consecutive year, losing to North Alabama, 23–13.

Schedule

References

Shepherd
Shepherd Rams football seasons
Shepherd Rams football